Rai Sport 2 was an Italian sports TV channel, launched on 18 May 2010 by the State-owned RAI television network. It broadcast Italian and international sports events in Italy on DTT channel 58 on Mux Rai 2. It was also available on Sky Italia and on IPTV.

Programming

When the channel was not broadcasting events, it transmitted the same programming of Rai Sport 1 delayed an hour, including the daily editions of the Tg Sport.

A few programmes include:
 Tour de France
 Milan–San Remo
 Paris–Nice
 Tirreno–Adriatico
 Giro di Sardegna
 Giro del Trentino
 Settimana internazionale di Coppi e Bartali
 Tour of the Basque Country
 Three Days of De Panne
 Tour of Flanders
 Brabantse Pijl
 UCI Road World Championships

References

External links
Official website 

Defunct RAI television channels
Sports television in Italy
Italian-language television stations
Television channels and stations established in 2010
Television channels and stations disestablished in 2017
2010 establishments in Italy
2017 disestablishments in Italy